Carmen Calisto Ponce (born 28 February 1942) is the wife of former Ecuadorian President Rodrigo Borja Cevallos and is thus the 36th First Lady of Ecuador, a position she held from 10 August 1988 to 9 August 1992.

Biography
Carmen Calisto Ponce was born in Quito on 28 February 1942 the eldest daughter of Gonzalo Calisto Enríquez and María Ponce Martínez, making her a descendant of the Counts of Selva Florida through her mother. When Calisto's mother died in her youth, she took on the responsibility of looking after her younger siblings.

Marriage and children
On 16 December 1966, in the city of Quito, Calisto married Rodrigo Borja Cevallos, at that time Jurist Commission that then President Clemente Yerovi assembled to draft a new constitution. They had four children:

Gabriela Borja Calisto
María del Carmen Borja Calisto
Rodrigo Borja Calisto
Verónica Borja Calisto

First Lady of Ecuador
As First Lady of Ecuador, Calisto was president of the National Institute of Children and Families (INNFA), hostess of Carondelet Palace, and companion to her husband to various formal functions at the national and international level. In a state visit to Spain, the couple were received by King Juan Carlos and Queen Sofía at the Palace of Zarzuela and Royal Palace of Madrid and Calisto was made a Grand Dame of Order of Isabella the Catholic.

Awards
 Order of Isabella the Catholic, Grand Cross. Granted by Juan Carlos I of Spain on 8 September 1989.

Citations

References

 

Living people
1942 births
First ladies of Ecuador
Dames Grand Cross of the Order of Isabella the Catholic
People from Quito
21st-century Ecuadorian women politicians
21st-century Ecuadorian politicians